Goribor is the eponymous debut album by the Serbian alternative rock band Goribor, released in 2007 by Dancing Bear in Croatia and Automatik Records in Serbia.

Track listing 
All lyrics written by Aleksandar Stojković "St". All music written by Aleksandar Stojković "St", except tracks 5 and 12, written by Željko Ljubić "Pity", and tracks 6, 9 and 11, written by Predrag Marković "Peđa".

Personnel 
Goribor
 Aleksandar Stojković "St" — vocals
 Željko Ljubić "Pity" — guitar
 Predrag Marković "Peđa" — guitar
 Milan Stošić "Žaba" — samples and effects

Additional personnel
 Edi Cukerić — producer
 Ivo Lorencin — mixed by, engineer, programmed by, sampler
 Mladen Malek — mixed by, engineer, programmed by, sampler
 Davor Milovan "Bili" — bass on tracks 1, 2, 3 and 12
 Marco Quarantotto — drums on tracks 1 and 12
 Zoran Angeleski "Šizo" — drums on tracks 1 and 12
 Leon Brenko — keyboards on tracks 2, 4, 5, 6 and 11 
 Saša Petković "Sale" — drums on track 11
 Bonzo — banjo on track 7
 Mirko Kusačić — guitar on track 8
 Predrag Ljuna — harmonica on tracks 8 and 11
 Morin Kudić — vocals on track 11
 Alen Rosanda "Ros" — guitar on track 14

References 

 Goribor at Discogs
 Album review at Popboks

Goribor albums
2007 albums
Albums recorded in Slovenia